Dyhia Belhabib is an environmental scientist and researcher specialising in illegal fishing, conservation, artisanal fishing and food security. She is currently principal fisheries investigator for Ecotrust Canada and founder of Spyglass. Her research has investigated the link between fishing industry and the illegal drug trade and conflict between artisanal fishing, illegal fishing, climate change and international fishing subsidies. She has also advocated for decolonization and greater equity in ocean science.

References

External links 

Living people
Environmental scientists
Fisheries scientists
University of British Columbia Faculty of Science alumni
Year of birth missing (living people)
Postcolonial theorists
Women conservationists
Women environmentalists